Robert James Puflett (17 August 1881 – 5 August 1968) was an Australian rules footballer who played with Melbourne in the Victorian Football League (VFL).

Notes

External links 

 

1881 births
1968 deaths
Australian rules footballers from Victoria (Australia)
Melbourne Football Club players